Brand New Morning is the fourth album by American singer-songwriter Bob Seger and his first solo studio album following the departure of backing band The Bob Seger System. It was produced by Punch Andrews and released in October 1971. The album has a stripped-down acoustic sound.

This album marked Seger's four-year departure from Capitol. His next album with Capitol would be Beautiful Loser, released in April 1975.

Track listing

Personnel
Bob Seger – guitar, piano, vocals

Production
Engineer: Milan Bogdan
Mixing: Punch Andrews, Milan Bogdan, Bob Seger
Cover photo: Thomas Weschler

References

Bob Seger albums
1971 albums
Albums produced by Punch Andrews
Capitol Records albums